The Pierce County Council is a county legislative council with jurisdiction over Pierce County, Washington. In addition to serving as the legislative branch of the county's government, the council is responsible for managing the Pierce County Sheriff's Office, public health and human services, public transportation (including the Pierce County Airport), wastewater management, parks, open space, trails, records, elections, and licensing. The council also has the ability to fill vacancies in the Washington House of Representatives and Washington State Senate.

Structure 
There are seven member of the Pierce County Council, each elected to serve four-year terms. Each member represents a district including approximately 130,000 residents. Council members are elected on a partisan basis.

Members

References 

County government in Washington (state)
County governing bodies in the United States

Pierce County, Washington